ARA King is a World War II-era Argentine Navy warship, originally classified as minelayer and later as patrol ship. The vessel is named after Juan King, an Argentine naval officer that served in the Cisplatine War. It is the third Argentine naval ship with this name.

Design 

King was as part of a program to build four mine warfare ships during the Second World War, of which two (Murature and King) were completed as patrol boats and the others (Piedrabuena and Azopardo) as antisubmarine frigates.

History 

King was launched in 1943 and commissioned in 1946.

In 1955 took part of rising against Juan Domingo Perón's government known as Revolución Libertadora, when she protected as a floating battery the rebel naval base at Río Santiago.

After the decommissioning of her sister  in 2014, King is the oldest unit still in service in the Argentine navy as of 2018. She was overhauled from 2015 to 2018 and was in service as of 2022.

See also 
 List of ships of the Argentine Navy

References

Notes

Bibliography

Further reading 

 
 .

External links 
 Patrol ship ARA “King” - Histarmar website (Historia y Arqueología Marítima – Patrullero ARA King) (accessed 2015-12-24)
 Argentine Navy website - Patrulleros Clase "MURATURE" (in Spanish - accessed 2013-10-31)

Murature-class patrol boats
Ships built in Argentina
1943 ships
Patrol vessels of Argentina
Riverine warfare